The 1872 Atlantic hurricane season was quiet, lasting from mid-summer through mid-autumn. There were five tropical cyclones, of which four attained hurricane status. However, in the absence of modern satellite and other remote-sensing technologies, only storms that affected populated land areas or encountered ships at sea were recorded, so the actual total could be higher. An undercount bias of zero to six tropical cyclones per year between 1851 and 1885 and zero to four per year between 1886 and 1910 has been estimated. Of the known 1872 cyclones, significant changes were made to the tracks of Hurricane Two and Hurricane Four in 1995 by Jose Fernandez-Partagas and Henry Diaz, who also proposed smaller changes to the known track of Hurricane Three. Further analysis, in 2003, revised the track of Hurricane Five.



Season summary 

The Atlantic hurricane database (HURDAT) recognizes five tropical cyclones for the 1872 season. Four storms attained hurricane status, with winds of 75 mph (119 km/h) or greater. Only two of the systems directly impacted land. The second hurricane of the season, was the most intense, with maximum sustained winds up to 100 mph (170 km/h). The first storm of the season was a tropical storm that developed in the Gulf of Mexico on July 9 and made landfall along the US Gulf coast before dissipating over Tennessee. Hurricane Two, the strongest storm of the season, traveled across the Atlantic from Cape Verde to Newfoundland between August 20 and September 1. Hurricane Three grew from a tropical storm that formed east of the Lesser Antilles. It traveled north and developed into a hurricane, but never made landfall and was last observed on September 19. Hurricane Four also never made landfall. Growing from a tropical storm first seen south-west of the Cape Verde Islands, it traveled across the Atlantic and was last seen near the Azores on October 6. The final storm of the season began as a tropical storm in the Gulf of Mexico on October 22. It crossed the Florida peninsula and hit South Carolina as a category 1 hurricane. It was last sighted on October 27.

Systems

Tropical Storm One 

Tropical Storm One formed in the central Gulf of Mexico on July 9. Tropical Storm One struck Louisiana and Mississippi before being last seen over Tennessee on July 13.

Hurricane Two 

Hurricane Two formed near Cape Verde on August 20. Hurricane Two headed across the Atlantic but then curved north and passed near Bermuda. Hurricane Two persisted until it was last seen near Newfoundland on September 2.

Hurricane Three 

On September 9, a tropical storm was observed east of the Lesser Antilles. Over the following two days, it moved slowly north-northwestward through the islands, before reaching hurricane status on September 12. It turned more toward the north, and passed east of Bermuda on September 15. It was last observed on September 19.

Hurricane Four 

A tropical storm formed on September 30 to the southwest of the Cape Verde islands. It tracked northwestward for several days, reaching hurricane status on October 3. Two days later it curved to the northeast, and the hurricane was last observed on October 6 near the Azores.

Hurricane Five 

In the southern Gulf of Mexico, a tropical storm developed on October 22. It crossed Florida from Cedar Key to Jacksonville as a 60 mph (97 km/h) tropical storm, and hit South Carolina as a minimal hurricane. It caused 4-8 inches of rain in the Norfolk area.

See also 

 1870-1879 Atlantic hurricane seasons
 Tropical cyclone observation
 Atlantic hurricane reanalysis project

References 

 
Atlantic hurricane seasons
Articles which contain graphical timelines
Atlantic
Atlantic